In mathematical optimization, the firefly algorithm is a metaheuristic proposed by Xin-She Yang and inspired by the flashing behavior of fireflies.

Algorithm 
In pseudocode the algorithm can be stated as:

 Begin
     1) Objective function: 
     2) Generate an initial population of fireflies 
     3) Formulate light intensity  so that it is associated with 
        (for example, for maximization problems, 
     4) Define absorption coefficient 
 
     while (t < MaxGeneration)
         for i = 1 : n (all n fireflies)
             for j = 1 : i (n fireflies)
                 
                     Vary attractiveness with distance r via 
                     move firefly i towards j;                
                     Evaluate new solutions and update light intensity;
                 end if 
             end for j
         end for i
         Rank fireflies and find the current best;
     end while
 end

Note that the number of objective function evaluations per loop is one evaluation per firefly, even though the above pseudocode suggests it is n×n. (Based on Yang's MATLAB code.) Thus the total number of objective function evaluations is (number of generations) × (number of fireflies).

 
where  is a parameter controlling the step size, while  is a vector drawn from a Gaussian or other
distribution.

It can be shown that the limiting case  corresponds to the standard Particle Swarm Optimization (PSO). In fact, if the inner loop (for j) is removed and the brightness  is replaced by the current global best , then FA essentially becomes the standard PSO.

Criticism 

Nature-inspired metaheuristics in general have attracted criticism in the research community for hiding their lack of novelty behind metaphors.  The firefly algorithm has been criticized as differing from the well-established particle swarm optimization only in a negligible way.

See also
 Swarm intelligence

References

External links
  Files of the Matlab programs included in the book: Xin-She Yang, Nature-Inspired Metaheuristic Algorithms, Second Edition, Luniver Press, (2010).

Nature-inspired metaheuristics